Cannabis is a genus of flowering plants. 

Cannabis may also refer to:

 Cannabis (drug), a psychoactive drug made from the cannabis plant, most often marijuana and hashish
 Medical cannabis, cannabis and cannabinoids prescribed by physicians for their patients
 Cannabis (film), a 1970 crime film 
 Cannabis (film score), by Serge Gainsbourg

See also 

 Etymology of cannabis
 Glossary of cannabis terms
 List of names for cannabis
 List of names for cannabis strains
 Hemp, a variety of Cannabis sativa grown specifically for industrial use
 Marijuana (disambiguation)